Belle Le Grand is a 1951 American Western film directed by Allan Dwan and written by D.D. Beauchamp. The film stars Vera Ralston, John Carroll, William Ching, Hope Emerson, Grant Withers, Stephen Chase, John Qualen and Harry Morgan. The film was released on January 27, 1951, by Republic Pictures.

Plot
In 1850, in Natchez, Mississippi, Sally Sinclair (Vera Ralston) is sentenced to prison as an accessory to murder. Upon her release five years later, she vows to get the money to take care of her young sister, Nan, and by the 1860s, has used her skill at gambling to amass a fortune. Soon she is a successful casino owner in San Francisco and using the name Belle Le Grand. Belle becomes involved in a silver mine intrigue between rivals Lucky John Kilton (John Carroll) and Montgomery Crane (Stephen Chase), a longtime nemesis of Belle's. When Nan Henshaw (Muriel Lawrence), now a trained and talented opera singer thanks to lessons paid for by Belle, gives a concert in San Francisco, she catches the eye of Kilton, though it is apparent Belle is interested in him. The story takes the characters to Virginia City, Nevada, where Belle must try to use her wits and wealth to help her sister even as she fights her feelings for Kilton and battles their mutual enemy, Crane.

Cast
Vera Ralston as Sally Sinclair / Belle Le Grand
John Carroll as John Kilton
William Ching as Bill Shanks
Hope Emerson as Emma McGee
Grant Withers as Shannon
Stephen Chase as Montgomery Crane
John Qualen as Corky McGee
Harry Morgan as Abel Stone 
Charles Cane as Cal
Thurston Hall as Parkington
Marietta Canty as Daisy
Glen Vernon as Bellboy
Muriel Lawrence as Nan Henshaw
Emory Parnell as Marshal at Concert

References

External links
 

1951 films
American Western (genre) films
1951 Western (genre) films
Republic Pictures films
Films directed by Allan Dwan
American black-and-white films
1950s English-language films
1950s American films